The P class are a class of diesel locomotives rebuilt from T class locomotives by Clyde Engineering, Somerton for V/Line in 1984–1985.

History

The P class were rebuilt from 1950s T class locomotives by Clyde Engineering. The rebuild involved a new cab and carbody, replacing the EMD 8-567C engine with an EMD 8-645E, replacement of the main generator and traction motors, and provision of a separate head end power generator.

Only first-series T Class locomotives were suitable for upgrading because their frames were designed for EMD 12-567 engines, with only 2/3rds of the length used to cut down on weight (and allow a Bo-Bo, instead of A1A-A1A or Co-Co wheel arrangement). When rebuilt, the 8-645 engine took the place formerly occupied by the 8–567, and the remaining space was utilised for the head-end power unit.

The first eight of the class were in service with V/Line; Pacific National has one engine stored, and Ettamogah Rail Hub has four. In passenger usage, they were most commonly used in push-pull mode with H type carriages, but also operated as single locomotives if required. In freight service, the head end power was occasionally used for the powering of refrigerated containers.

When first introduced, it was hoped to allow push-pull operations with one locomotive permanently allocated to a single three- or four-car H set, with a driving cab installed in the non-locomotive end of that set. This failed because while the Harris motor cabs were sufficient for 1950s standards of comfort and visibility, the conversion cost any application of the grandfather clause and so visibility of signals etc. was deemed insufficient.

By September 2017, all of V/Line's P class locomotives had been withdrawn from regular passenger service, having been replaced by the VLocity diesel multiple units. Though P12, P13, which had been converted to standard gauge, and P15 were retained and are stored at South Dynon. In 2019 Southern Shorthaul Railroad acquired some P class locomotives from V/line. They remain in V/Line colours but with V/Line logos painted over and replaced with the SSR logo. In October 2022, P14 was sighted in SSR Yellow and Black livery at North Bendigo workshops, returning to South Dynon on October 18th before heading out to Cranbourne, Caulfield and Carrum with EV120 "Evie" and T386 the following day

Status table

Model Railways

HO scale
Bendigo Rail Models, selling through Auscision, released a model of the P Class locomotive in 2014.

Models in V/Line Orange (P11, P14, P16 and P18) and both Freight Australia (P19 and P20) and Freight Australia with Pacific National decals (P21 and P22) are fitted with the original head-end power fan arrangement, handrails and small side mirrors. Models in V/Line Passenger Mark 1 (P11 and P15) are fitted with the modified head-end-power fan arrangement and the large side mirrors, but the original handrail layout. The remaining models, V/Line Passenger Mk2 (P13 and P17) and Mk3 (P11 and P12) are fitted with the modified head-end-power fan arrangement, the large side mirrors, and the modern handrail layout. The range does not include any models of locomotive P23.

N scale
Brass etched kit by Aust-N-Rail. 3D printed kit by Rob Popovski.

References

Bo-Bo locomotives
Clyde Engineering locomotives
Pacific National diesel locomotives
Railway locomotives introduced in 1984
P class
Broad gauge locomotives in Australia
Diesel-electric locomotives of Australia
Standard gauge locomotives of Australia